George Barraud (17 December 1889, in Paddington, London, England – January 1970, in London, England) was a British film actor.

Selected filmography
 Little Old New York (1923)
 Flaming Youth (1923)
 The Wolf Man (1924)
 Ned McCobb's Daughter (1928)
 Tropic Madness (1928) Movie thought lost except for one reel discovered 2022 - now on Youtube
 The Bellamy Trial (1929)
 The Last of Mrs. Cheyney (1929)
 Woman to Woman (1929)
 Peacock Alley (1930)
 The Happy Ending (1931)
 The Return of Raffles (1932)
 Women Who Play (1932)
 After Dark (1933)
 Great Expectations (1934)
 Charlie Chan in London (1934)
 Mystery Woman (1935)
 Accused (1936)
 Two on a Doorstep (1936)
 Show Flat (1936)
 Talk of the Devil (1936)
 Stolen Life (1939)

References

External links

1889 births
1970 deaths
People from Paddington
English male film actors
English male silent film actors
20th-century English male actors